Statistics of Lao League in the 2007 season.

Overview
Lao-American College FC won the championship.

References
RSSSF

Lao Premier League seasons
1
Laos
Laos